The "Champs International Skating Centre of British Columbia" (formerly known as the 'BC Centre of Excellence') is one of two major figure skating training centers in Canada. Located in Burnaby, British Columbia, it is home to many great national and international skaters. The programs there are overseen by a staff, including Joanne McLeod, who coaches 3-time Canadian men's national champion Emanuel Sandhu; Bruno Marcotte, who competed at the 2002 Winter Olympics; Victor Kraatz, the 2003 World Champion in ice dancing, and Maikki Uotila, who was a national champion in Finland. The center operates out of Canlan Ice Sports Burnaby 8 Rinks. Notable skaters who train there include Emanuel Sandhu, Mira Leung, Allie Hann-McCurdy & Michael Coreno, Jessica Millar & Ian Moram, Jeremy Ten, and Kevin Reynolds. This skating school is sometimes known as a training site for international competitors to practice for competitions in Vancouver. Champs International hosts its annual competition known as the BC/YK SummerSkate Competition every August.

See also
 Mariposa School of Skating

External links
 BC Centre of Excellence

Figure skating clubs in Canada
Sport in Burnaby